Timothy Alexander Pickup (6 October 1948 – 7 June 2021) was an Australian Rugby League footballer for the North Sydney Bears, Canterbury-Bankstown Bulldogs, New South Wales and Australian national side in the 1970s. He played Rugby Union for the Manly Rugby Club as a teenage prodigy for three seasons in the late 1960s.
In retirement Pickup was involved in boxing at famed Newtown PCYC and was Jeff Harding's manager when he won the WBC World Light-Heavyweight title in 1989. He was the foundation CEO of the Adelaide Rams franchise of the Australian Super League in 1995. In 2000 he was awarded the Australian Sports Medal for services to Australian sport. Pickup was named in the North Sydney Bears Team of the Century in 2006 and was a finalist for both the Canterbury-Bankstown Bulldogs 70th Anniversary team as well as Manly Rugby Union's Team of the Century.

Early years
Tim Pickup was born in Sydney, New South Wales, Australia as the second of three sons to Harrie and Mary Pickup, between brothers Paul and Chris.
His father Harrie was a lower-grade player for St. George and Eastern Suburbs, and his brother, Tim's uncle, Laurie was an outstanding 1st grade Rugby League player with the Eastern Suburbs Roosters (player #258).

Laurie Pickup is on record as the 3rd youngest ever captain of the Tri-colors whose career was cut short when killed on duty at age 22 during World War II.

Enfield Federals
Tim Pickup was a Western Suburbs Rugby League junior who played his formative years with the Enfield Federals J.R.L.F.C. from 1959 to 1965. The Federals were formed in 1909 playing in B Grade of the Western Suburbs Junior Rugby Union. After winning the title in their first season, the entire side switched to Rugby League in 1910 but there was a split with many of players forming Campsie Triers and the remainder forming Enfield Mercantile, two the teams in the first Western Suburbs JRL competition. The 2 groups came back together as Enfield Federals and won the 1911 competition and then repeated their success in 1912. 7 players from the 1909 to 1912 teams subsequently played 1st Grade for Western Suburbs. In the 1930s the club dissolved, to be reformed by Tim's father Harrie and friend Jim Begnell in the late 1950s.

The Federals became a juggernaut and Pickup's teammates included six future Sydney first-graders, including Michael McClean – Manly, North Sydney and Wests (son of former Western Suburbs captain Peter McClean), Neville Hornery – Canterbury and Wests, Geoff Nielsen – Canterbury and Easts, John Clark – Wests and Parramatta, as well as Rod Smith and Australian horse-racing identity, Frank Tagg – both Wests. Legendary Balmain, NSW and Australian Rugby League trainer/conditioner, and noted hard man Les Hobbs was also a key member of this team.

The Enfield Federals were such a dominant side they went undefeated for seven years, and ironically lost their one and only game, the 1965 Grand Final which was Pickup's last ever match for the club. During the Federals reign they quickly ran out of opponents, having to play up an age group to get a game and eventually had to shift to other Junior Leagues (Balmain, Newtown) to be accommodated. The Federals were such a force that twelve out of the starting thirteen line-up represented Western Suburbs RLFC in the 1963 S.G Ball/Oatley Shield and 1965 Jersey Flegg and won both competitions undefeated, with Tim Pickup as five-eighth and captain.

In 1965, Western Suburbs RLFC called upon Pickup and teammate Neville Hornery to play in the 3rd grade open-age semi-finals. Harrie Pickup deemed his son to be too young for this promotion at only 16 years of age, yet Neville not only accepted the challenge, he excelled and so began his chequered career. Hornery never realised his immense potential and after five short seasons he misbehaved his way out of a couple of clubs, leaving all who saw him play to wonder what might have been.

Pickup did his schooling at St. Patrick's Strathfield, and graduated from Christian Brothers Lewisham in 1965. He was offered a high school scholarship to storied Rugby Union nursery, St. Joseph's Hunter's Hill but declined for at that time was not a fan of the game.

At the end of 1965 Harrie Pickup decided to move his family to the Northern Beaches, as all three brothers had discovered surfing and were regulars on the Peninsula. The Pickups settled in Curl Curl.
mi

Manly Rugby Union

Pickup's Rugby League career stalled when his family relocated as the Western Suburbs RLFC did not grant a transfer/release for Tim to further his career with any club other than Wests, and especially not to Manly-Warringah.

With options few and far between Pickup tagged along with a work mate to the Manly Rugby Club and never having played the sport, quickly rose through the grades in the pre-season and was named starting 1st grade stand-off as a 17-year-old in the first game of the 1966 season, against reigning Premiers Randwick. Pickup played three straight years at five-eighth/stand-off uninterrupted, never missing the 1st grade starting line-up through form or injury. Manly was competitive during the entirety of Pickup's tenure, his last ever game for the club being the 1968 Grand Final which they lost to Sydney University, 23–6. A Manly teammate of Pickup's was future dual-international Steve Knight, who was also a teenager at the time.

Frustrated with a lack of progress on the representative scene, Pickup felt he was a victim of his Rugby League heritage and stubbornly severed his ties and set off to England on a working holiday, and did not return to Australia until 1972. Pickup was one of five finalists nominated for the position of five-eighth in Manly Marlins team of the century in 2008.

England

While working in England Pickup was spotted playing touch football in a London park and was recommended for a trial with legendary club, St. Helens RLFC. He bolted up north for the opportunity and was signed after a couple of lower grade games. 
With a glut of talent already on their books, Tim was 'loaned' out to 1st division battlers, Blackpool Borough where he played fullback and earned their player of the year award for the 1970 and 1971 seasons.

Now married to his Australian wife Jan, with his passport full of stamps due to regular jaunts to the continent (including a forced visit to the US for overstaying his British visa – a trip to take in the Woodstock music festival), Pickup again got itchy feet when unable to get a recall to St. Helens' first team. His stellar play didn't go unnoticed and he began to generate massive interest in his native Australia and decided to return.

North Sydney Bears

With multiple clubs vying for his services, Pickup decided on North Sydney (#691) because they were the team that had suffered the longest drought between premierships, and he wanted to make a difference.  His impact was felt immediately and although Norths fortunes improved, they still hovered around the middle of the ladder during Tim's short time as a Bear from 1972 to 1974.

Personally he achieved instant success at the representative level, after playing for City firsts and New South Wales (NSW #664), he made the Australian team (#462) alongside Norths teammate George Ambrum.  Tim played two Tests against New Zealand in 1972 partnering Tommy Raudonikis in the halves, with Bob Fulton in the centres, a combination which was regularly used by selectors over the next four seasons. 
Pickup then toured with the 1973 Kangaroos and played in 4 Tests and 14 tour matches. He generally played at five-eighth, though he was selected at halfback in the 2nd Test against France. 
Tim's last Test match as a North Sydney Bear was against the touring Great Britain side in 1974 series. He was named the Bears player of the year for the 1973 and 1974 seasons.

Frustrated at his club's policy towards player retention and its lack of ambition in recruiting star-quality players, Pickup decided it was time to move on and signed a massive (for the day) five-year contract to captain Canterbury-Bankstown, (#406) who were known as the Berries at that time.

Canterbury-Bankstown Bulldogs

Tim Pickup took two teammates with him from the Bears and together their impact at Belmore was immediate. Promising young centre Keith Harris developed though never realised his enormous potential, and Dave Cooper's contribution should never be underestimated by Canterbury fans.

Cooper at that stage had just retired and the former Norths, Balmain and Cronulla forward turned his passion for fitness into the role of trainer/conditioner. His tough training regime set the tone for Canterbury's team, giving them a physical and mental edge and a template that has been replicated by future Bulldogs squads right up until the present day. Dave Cooper's massive influence on the club was recognised when he was awarded life membership in 2010.

Pickup's tenure with the Belmore club  started with a bang in 1975. As captain he led the team to a barnstorming start to the season, and after the club's loss in the 1974 NSWRFL season's grand final to Eastern Suburbs the Belmore faithful were feeling that they had found the missing piece to the elusive premiership puzzle. Tim was first choice five-eighth for all representative games for City, State and for Australia, but that momentum came crashing to a halt when he severely injured his knee in a World Cup match against England at the Sydney Cricket Ground in June of that season. Canterbury were in 2nd place at that time and eventually were knocked out in the major semi-final and Pickup did not play again that year. He also missed the entire 1976 season recovering from complications of the same injury.

Pickup returned in 1977 to captain the newly named Bulldogs, but his speed was zapped due to his knee injury and after being dropped to 2nd grade for the first time in his career, in either code, he spent the rest of his days as a professional alternating between 1st and reserve grade. Although devastated at the demotion, Pickup had a significant influence on the next generation of pups who graduated to be Bulldog superstars over the next decade. Players such as Chris Anderson, Steve Folkes, George Peponis, Greg Brentnall and the Mortimer brothers, Steve, Peter and Chris, all served their apprenticeships alongside Pickup during their formative years. Steve Mortimer states as much in his biography "Top Dog", devoting a chapter to the issue, with the title 'Toughened by Tim (Pickup) Tom (Raudonikis) and Terry (Lamb).'

Pickup was named KB Man of the Round in May 1978 and captained the Bulldogs 1st grade side for the final time that season. He played a single 1st grade game in 1979, finishing his career at Belmore as captain of the 2nd grade side in a Grand Final loss to Parramatta. He was named Clubman of the Year in 1979.

Post Rugby League career
Tim Pickup worked for AMP from the mid-1960s to the mid-1990s as a financial planner. He also owned a successful chain of donut shops in three Sydney locations. His last day of work was as CEO of the now defunct Adelaide Rams. He also managed boxer Jeff 'Hitman' Harding when he won the WBC Light-Heavyweight world title in 1989.

Upon retirement from the Bulldogs, with the urging of Bulldog patriarch Peter "Bullfrog" Moore, Pickup became a director of the football club and served in this capacity for well over a decade. This was without a doubt the most successful period in the team's history. Scouting was also one of his duties, his most notable discovery being Australian representative David Gillespie. He was awarded life membership at Canterbury-Bankstown in 1985.

Super League

When Peter Moore decided to stand down from his post as chief executive of Canterbury in the mid-1990s, he offered the position to Pickup, who in turn declined for personal reasons. With the advent of Super League the following year in 1995, Moore campaigned heavily for Pickup to become CEO of the ill-fated Adelaide Rams, a position he accepted and held for under a year. Pickup was present for the entire Super League court proceedings as chief of the Rams. He moved on from that position into retirement after the ARL injunction prevented Super League from kicking off in the 1996 season. He remained involved with the Bulldogs from that point onwards, and returned in an official capacity in 2002.

Salary cap scandal

In the wake of Canterbury's 2002 Salary Cap scandal, Tim Pickup was recruited by then CEO Steve Mortimer to a place on his hand-picked Board. He was one of a host of former Bulldogs players such as Clive Gartner, George Peponis and Terry Lamb among others, assembled to restore pride in the jersey after the former regime nearly crippled the club. Unprecedented NRL penalties included a record fine ($500K) and deduction of competition points (37) that sent the team from first to last and claim the wooden spoon, on the back of 17 straight victories. Pickup stayed on until the club got back on its feet, even through the Coffs Harbour scandal that followed two years later.

Unhappy with the unfair dismissal of former teammate Garry Hughes in that incident's aftermath, Pickup strongly disagreed with the sacking of Hughes and left quietly, along with Gartner after the Bulldogs won the 2004 NRL Premiership the same season.

Boxing

Tim Pickup was heavily involved with Johnny Lewis and the Newtown Police Boys PCYC during Australian boxing's golden age, from the early 80's. He used to take a gruelling forty-minute circuit class twice a week that was patronised by future boxing World Champions Jeff Fenech, Jeff Harding and Joe Bugner, as well as 1st grade Rugby League players Steve Mortimer, Billy Johnstone, Pat Jarvis and Geordie Peats among others.

Pickup became Jeff 'Hitman' Harding's manager after the boxer was selected in the Australian team for the 1986 Commonwealth Games in Edinburgh, Scotland. All members needed to raise $5,000 to get on the plane, so Pickup appealed to Canterbury-Bankstown Bulldogs boss Peter Moore, who signed off on the request. Grateful for the assistance, Harding walked into the ring for the gold medal bout wearing a Canterbury-Bankstown Bulldogs jersey, minus the required Australian tracksuit.
Harding lost the bout and had to settle for a silver medal, and was told in no uncertain terms by officials that he had better turn professional as he had just fought his last fight as amateur, as far as they were concerned. They felt Harding had disrespected the Australian team by wearing the Bulldogs jersey.

With Johnny Lewis as his trainer, Harding approached Pickup to be his manager as a professional fighter following the assistance that he provided in getting the boxer to Edinburgh. Pickup originally declined but was eventually talked into it by his good friend Lewis. Harding scaled the ranks quickly, for his style was much more suited to the professional ranks as opposed to the amateur criteria.
Harding quickly went into world title calculations after leaving behind him a trail of battered foes. He was undefeated when he was called upon as a last minute replacement to fight WBC Light-Heavyweight champion Dennis Andries in Atlantic City, USA in 1989.

After initially declining the WBC invitation due to inexperience, Lewis and Pickup reconsidered fearing they may never get another opportunity for their young pugilist. What ensued was that of a fairy tale, Harding came from behind on points to win in the most dramatic of fashions, knocking Andries down three times in the 12th and final round before the referee stopped the contest, showing mercy to the former champion.

Harding v Andries 1 was named the World Boxing Council's Fight of the Year, 1989. Jeff Harding was given the award by Mike Tyson at the 1990 WBC convention.

The Ring magazine "The Bible of Boxing" listed the fight as no.58 in their 100 Greatest Title Fights of All-Time.

Tim Pickup ranks Harding's win as his absolute sporting highlight, eclipsing his own personal achievements. He managed Harding for the best part of a decade, that saw the 'Hitman' fight for the world title on eight occasions. (Harding won it twice, defended it four times and lost it twice. He fought Andries in three title fights for two wins and a loss.)

Honours

Pickup was awarded the Australian Sporting Medal in 2000 for services to Australian sport. Pickup was originally named in the Canterbury-Bankstown Bulldogs 70th Anniversary Team in 2004, (named one of the club's 20 greatest players, on the bench-not the starting line-up) but was omitted due to a technicality, when it was revealed he had only played 47 1st grade games and was three games short of the 50 game minimum. Pickup was nominated as one of the final four five-eighths/stand-offs for Manly Rugby Union's Team of the Century in 2005.

Pickup was also named halfback on Roy Slaven and H.G. Nelson's 'All-time Mustachioed Rugby League Team' on their nationally syndicated program 'This Sporting Life' on radio station Triple J in 1998.

Death

Pickup died on 7 June 2021 after a long battle with dementia.

References

Sources
Bob Fulton's Rugby League By Peter Muszkat & Bob Fulton, Pot Still Press 1978
Berries to Bulldogs : Fifty years of Canterbury-Bankstown R.L.F.C. By Gary Lester, Lester-Townsend Publishing 1985.
Top Dog - The Steve Mortimer story By Norman Tasker, Hutchison Publishing 1988. 
Sterlo! The story of a Champion - Peter Sterling By Ian Heads, Lester-Townsend Publishing 1989.
The Kangaroos - The saga of Rugby League's great tours By Ian Heads, Lester-Townsend Publishing 1990.
Fatty and Chook: Laughing at League Paul Vautin and Johnny Raper tell football's funniest stories By Ian Heads, Lester-Townsend Publishing 1990.
The Bulldogs Story - A history of the Canterbury-Bankstown Rugby League Club By Gary Lester, Playwright Publishing 1991.
Jeff Fenech : I love youse all! By Terry Smith, Modern Publishing Group 1993.
Straight between the posts: The legendary Frank Hyde and his stories By Ian Heads, Ironbark Pan MacMillan Publishing 1995.
Super League : The inside story By Mike Colman, Pan Macmillan Publishing 1996
Good as Gould – Phil Gould's stormy life in football.  By Ray Chesterton, Ironbark Pan MacMillan Publishing 1996.
Big Artie – The autobiography of Arthur Beetson. With Ian Heads, ABC Books 2004.
'Captaining the Kangaroos - Rugby League Test and World Cup Captains' By Alan Whitticker, New Holland Publishing 2004.
'Dogs at War – Triumph,Treachery,Truth' Graeme Hughes with Larry Writer, Allen & Unwin 2010.
'Johnny Lewis : The Biography – The story of Australia's King of Boxing' By Paul Kent, Allen & Unwin 2010.
'Macca : Bob McCarthy - My life in Rugby League' New Holland Publishing 2012. 
'Mud Blood and Beer : Rugby League in the 1970s' By Alan Whitticker, New Holland Publishing 2014
'Dogs of War : 80 years of the Canterbury Bankstown Rugby League Club' By Gary Lester, Playwright Publishing 2016.
'The Great Grand Final Heist : A mysterious tale of Tigers, Rabbitohs and an unlikely coaching hero' By Ian Heads, Stoke Hill Press 2017.
Men of League Foundation.'Tim Pickup OAM - A modest sporting legend' Story by Ken Vessey, November 2017
https://menofleague.com/2017/11/29/tim-pickup-oam-modest-sporting-legend/ 
'Great Australian Sporting Tales' 65 Tales from on and off the field. "The Globetrotter" By Ian Heads & Norman Tasker,Pan MacMillan Publishing 2019.
St.Helens Star, UK. 'Australian Test Star Tim Pickup, one that got away from Saints' 15/5/2020
https://www.sthelensstar.co.uk/news/18450559.australian-test-star-tim-pickup-one-got-away-saints/ 
The Ring magazine "The Bible of Boxing" – The 100 Greatest Title Fights of All-Time Holiday 1996 Issue. Sports & Entertainment Publishing,LLC
BoxRec.com

External links
Canterbury Bulldogs profile

1948 births
2021 deaths
North Sydney Bears players
Canterbury-Bankstown Bulldogs players
Australia national rugby league team players
New South Wales rugby league team players
City New South Wales rugby league team players
Sportsmen from New South Wales
Rugby league players from Sydney
Blackpool Borough players
Australian rugby league administrators
Rugby league five-eighths
Rugby league halfbacks
Rugby league fullbacks